Makiš Stadium is the home ground of Milicionar. It's also known simply as Milicionar Stadium. The all-seated stadium was named after Makiš forest. The stadium has a seating capacity for around 4,000. Since 2011 Rugby League World Cup qualifications tournament, Serbia national rugby league team use this stadium as its home ground.

See also
 List of stadiums in Serbia

References

External links
 Prezentacije.mup.gov.rs

Football venues in Serbia
Football venues in Serbia and Montenegro
Football venues in Yugoslavia
Sports venues in Belgrade
Rugby league stadiums in Serbia
Čukarica